Governor Mark is a quality standard for School Governing Bodies in England.  It was developed in 2006.  The process of accreditation involves assessment against a detailed framework covering all aspects of the responsibilities of school governance. Achievement of the award has a validity of three years, after which reassessment will be required, and allows the school to display the GLM (governance, leadership and management) Governor Mark logo.

External links
 GLM website
 National Governors Association website

Education in the United Kingdom